Scopula obliquisignata is a moth of the  family Geometridae. It is found in Tanzania.

References

Moths described in 1909
obliquisignata
Moths of Africa